Wendell Phillips (November 29, 1811 – February 2, 1884) was an American abolitionist, advocate for Native Americans, orator, and attorney.

According to George Lewis Ruffin, a Black attorney, Phillips was seen by many Blacks as "the one white American wholly color-blind and free from race prejudice". According to another Black attorney, Archibald Grimké, as an abolitionist leader he is ahead of William Lloyd Garrison and Charles Sumner. From 1850 to 1865 he was the "preëminent figure" in American abolitionism.

Early life and education 
Phillips was born in Boston, Massachusetts, on November 29, 1811, to Sarah Walley and John Phillips, a wealthy lawyer, politician, and philanthropist, who was the first mayor of Boston. He was a descendant of Reverend George Phillips, who emigrated from England to Watertown, Massachusetts, in 1630.  All of his ancestors migrated to North America from England, and all of them arrived in Massachusetts between the years 1630 and 1650.

Phillips was schooled at Boston Latin School, and graduated from Harvard College in 1831. He went on to attend Harvard Law School, from which he graduated in 1833. In 1834, Phillips was admitted to the Massachusetts state bar, and in the same year, he opened a law practice in Boston. His professor of oratory was Edward T. Channing, a critic of flowery speakers such as Daniel Webster. Channing emphasized the value of plain speaking, a philosophy which Phillips took to heart.

Marriage to Ann Terry Greene 
In 1836, Phillips was supporting the abolitionist cause when he met Ann Greene. It was her opinion that this cause required not just support but total commitment. Phillips and Greene were engaged that year and Greene declared Wendell to be her "best three quarters". They were married until Wendell's death, 46 years later.

Abolitionism 

On October 21, 1835, the Boston Female Anti-Slavery Society announced that British abolitionist George Thompson would be speaking. Pro-slavery forces posted nearly 500 notices of a $100 reward for the citizen that would first lay violent hands on him. Thompson canceled at the last minute, and Wm. Lloyd Garrison, editor and publisher of the abolitionist newspaper The Liberator, was quickly scheduled to speak in his place. A lynch mob formed, forcing Garrison to escape through the back of the hall and hide in a carpenter's shop. The mob soon found him, putting a noose around his neck to drag him away. Several strong men, including the mayor, intervened and took him to the most secure place in Boston, the Leverett Street Jail. Phillips, watching from nearby Court Street, was a witness to the attempted lynching.

After being converted to the abolitionist cause by Garrison in 1836, Phillips stopped practicing law in order to dedicate himself to the movement. Phillips joined the American Anti-Slavery Society and frequently made speeches at its meetings. So highly regarded were Phillips' oratorical abilities that he was known as "abolition's golden trumpet". Like many of Phillips' fellow abolitionists who honored the free-produce movement, he condemned the purchase of cane sugar and clothing made of cotton, since both were produced by the labor of slaves. He was a member of the Boston Vigilance Committee, an organization that assisted fugitive slaves in avoiding slavecatchers.

It was Phillips's contention that racial injustice was the source of all of society's ills. Like Garrison, Phillips denounced the Constitution for tolerating slavery. He disagreed with abolitionist Lysander Spooner and maintained that slavery was part of the Constitution, and more generally disputed Spooner's notion that any judge could find slavery illegal.

In 1845, in an essay titled "No Union With Slaveholders", he argued that the country would be better off, and not complicit in their guilt, if it let the slave states secede:

The experience of the fifty years...shows us the slaves trebling in numbers—slaveholders monopolizing the offices and dictating the policy of the Government—prostituting the strength and influence of the Nation to the support of slavery here and elsewhere—trampling on the rights of the free States, and making the courts of the country their tools. To continue this disastrous alliance longer is madness. The trial of fifty years only proves that it is impossible for free and slave States to unite on any terms, without all becoming partners in the guilt and responsible for the sin of slavery. Why prolong the experiment? Let every honest man join in the outcry of the American Anti-Slavery Society. (Quoted in Ruchames, The Abolitionists p. 196)

On December 8, 1837, in Boston's Faneuil Hall, Phillips' leadership and oratory established his preeminence within the abolitionist movement. Bostonians gathered at Faneuil Hall to discuss Elijah P. Lovejoy's murder by a mob outside his abolitionist newspaper's office in Alton, Illinois, on November 7. Lovejoy died defending himself and his press from pro-slavery rioters who set fire to a warehouse storing his press and shot Lovejoy as he stepped outside to tip a ladder being used by the mob. His death engendered a national controversy between abolitionists and anti-abolitionists.

At Faneuil Hall, Massachusetts attorney general James T. Austin defended the anti-abolitionist mob, comparing their actions to 1776 patriots who fought against the British and declaring that Lovejoy "died as the fool dieth!"

Deeply disgusted, Phillips spontaneously rebutted, praising Lovejoy's actions as a defense of liberty akin to that of the patriots'. Inspired by Phillips' eloquence and conviction, Garrison entered a partnership with him that came to define the beginning of the 1840s abolitionist movement.

Trip to Europe
The married couple went abroad in 1839 for two years. They spent the summer in Great Britain and the rest of each year in mainland Europe. They made important connections and Ann wrote of them meeting Elizabeth Pease and being particularly impressed by the Quaker abolitionist Richard D. Webb. In 1840 they went to London to join up with other American delegates to the World Anti-Slavery Convention at the Exeter Hall in London. Phillips' new wife was one of a number of female delegates, who included Lucretia Mott, Mary Grew, Sarah Pugh, Abby Kimber, Elizabeth Neall and Emily Winslow. The delegates were astounded to find that female delegates had not been expected and they were not welcome at the convention.

Instructed by his wife not to "shilly-shally", Phillips went in to appeal the case. According to the history of the women's rights movement of Susan B. Anthony's and Elizabeth Cady Stanton, Phillips spoke as the convention opened, scolding the organizers for precipitating an unnecessary conflict:

The efforts of Phillips and others were only partly successful.  The women were allowed in but had to sit separately and were not allowed to talk.  This event has been taken by Stanton, Anthony, and others as the point at which the women's rights movement began.

Before the Civil War
In 1854, Phillips was indicted for his participation in the celebrated attempt to rescue Anthony Burns, a captured fugitive slave, from a jail in Boston. Was he tried? Convicted?

After John Brown was executed in December of 1859, Phillips attended and spoke at his funeral, at the John Brown Farm in remote North Elba, New York. He met Mary Brown and the coffin in Troy, New York, where she changed trains, and expressed, unsuccessfully, his wish that Brown would be buried, with a monument, in Mt. Auburn Cemetery in Cambridge, Massachusetts, which he felt would help the abolitionist cause. He spoke at the funeral and on the way home, repeated his speech the next night to a wildly enthusiastic audience in Vergennes, Vermont.

On the eve of the Civil War, Phillips gave a speech at the New Bedford Lyceum in which he defended the Confederate States' right to secede:

In 1860 and 1861, many abolitionists welcomed the formation of the Confederacy because it would end the South's stranglehold over the United States government. This position was rejected by nationalists like Abraham Lincoln, who insisted on holding the Union together while gradually ending slavery. Twelve days after the attack on Fort Sumter, Phillips announced his "hearty and hot" support for the war. Disappointed with what he regarded as Lincoln's slow action, Phillips opposed his reelection in 1864, breaking with Garrison, who supported a candidate for the first time.

In the summer of 1862, Phillips' nephew, Samuel D. Phillips, died at Port Royal, South Carolina, where he had gone to take part in the so-called Port Royal Experiment to assist the slave population there in the transition to freedom.

Women's rights activism 
Phillips was also an early advocate of women's rights. In 1840 he led the unsuccessful effort at the World Anti-Slavery Convention in London to have America's women delegates seated. In the July 3, 1846, issue of The Liberator he called for securing women's rights to their property and earnings as well as to the ballot. He wrote:

In 1849 and 1850, he assisted Lucy Stone in conducting the first woman suffrage petition campaign in Massachusetts, drafting for her both the petition and an appeal for signatures. They repeated the effort the following two years, sending several hundred signatures to the state legislature. In 1853, they directed their petition to a convention charged with revising the state constitution, and sent it petitions bearing five thousand signatures. Together Phillips and Stone addressed the convention's Committee on Qualifications of Voters on May 27, 1853. In 1854, Phillips helped Stone call a New England Woman's Rights convention to expand suffrage petitioning into the other New England states.

Phillips was a member of the National Woman's Rights Central Committee, which organized annual conventions throughout the 1850s, published its Proceedings, and executed plans adopted by the conventions. He was a close adviser of Lucy Stone, and a major presence at most of the conventions, for which he wrote resolutions defining the movement's principles and goals. His address to the 1851 convention, later called "Freedom for Woman", was used as a women's rights tract into the twentieth century. In March 1857, Phillips and Stone were granted hearings by the Massachusetts and Maine legislatures on the woman suffrage memorial sent to twenty-five legislatures by the 1856 National Woman's Rights Convention. As the movement's treasurer, Phillips was trustee with Lucy Stone and Susan B. Anthony of a $5,000 fund given anonymously to the movement in 1858, called the "Phillips fund" until the death of the benefactor, Francis Jackson, in 1861, and thereafter the "Jackson Fund".

Postbellum activism 

Phillips's philosophical ideal was mainly self-control of the animal, physical self by the human, rational mind, although he admired martyrs like Elijah Lovejoy and John Brown. Historian Gilbert Osofsky has argued that Phillips's nationalism was shaped by a religious ideology derived from the European Enlightenment, as expressed by Thomas Paine, Thomas Jefferson, James Madison, and Alexander Hamilton. The Puritan ideal of a Godly Commonwealth through a pursuit of Christian morality and justice, however, was the main influence on Phillips' nationalism. He favored getting rid of American slavery by letting the slave states secede, and he sought to amalgamate all the American "races". Thus, it was the moral end which mattered most in Phillips' nationalism.

Reconstruction Era activism 
As Northern victory in the Civil War seemed more imminent, Phillips, like many other abolitionists, turned his attention to the questions of Reconstruction. In 1864, he gave a speech at the Cooper Institute in New York arguing that enfranchisement of freedmen should be a necessary condition for the readmission of Southern states to the Union. Unlike other white abolitionist leaders such as Garrison, Phillips thought that securing civil and political rights for freedmen was an essential component of the abolitionist cause, even after the formal legal end of slavery. Along with Frederick Douglass, Phillips argued that without voting rights, the rights of freedmen would be "ground to powder" by white Southerners.

He lamented the passage of the Fourteenth Amendment without provisions for black suffrage, and fervently opposed the Reconstruction regime of President Andrew Johnson, affixing a new masthead to the National Anti-Slavery Standard newspaper which read "Defeat the Amendment–Impeach the President." As Radical Republicans in Congress broke with Johnson and pursued their own Reconstruction policies through the Freedmen's Bureau bills and the Civil Rights Act of 1866, their views converged increasingly with Phillips'. However, most congressional Republicans disagreed with his assertion that "suffrage is nothing but a name because the voter has not...an acre from which he could retire from the persecution of landlordism"; in other words, Phillips and the Republicans diverged on the issue of land redistribution to the freedmen.

Despite his belief that Ulysses S. Grant was not suited for the presidential office and dissatisfaction with Grant's and the party's refusal to endorse his comprehensive Reconstruction program of "land, education and the ballot", Phillips supported Grant and the Republican Party in the 1868 election. The Republicans did pass the Fifteenth Amendment constitutionalizing black suffrage in 1870, but the goal of land redistribution was never realized.

In 1879, Phillips argued that black suffrage and political participation during Reconstruction had not been a failure, and that the main error of the era had been the failure to redistribute land to the freedmen. He defended black voters as being "less purchasable than the white man," credited black labor and rule for the nascent regrowth of the Southern economy, and commended black bravery against attacks from the first Ku Klux Klan.

As the Reconstruction era came to a close, Phillips increased his attention to other issues, such as women's rights, universal suffrage, temperance, and the labor movement.

Equal rights for Native Americans 
Phillips was also active in efforts to gain equal rights for Native Americans, arguing that the Fifteenth Amendment also granted citizenship to Indians. He proposed that the Andrew Johnson administration create a cabinet-level post that would guarantee Indian rights. Phillips helped create the Massachusetts Indian Commission with Indian rights activist Helen Hunt Jackson and Massachusetts governor William Claflin. Although publicly critical of President Ulysses S. Grant's drinking, he worked with Grant's second administration on the appointment of Indian agents.  Phillips lobbied against military involvement in the settling of Native American problems on the Western frontier. He accused General Philip Sheridan of pursuing a policy of Indian extermination.

Public opinion turned against Native American advocates after the Battle of the Little Bighorn in July 1876, but Phillips continued to support the land claims of the Lakota (Sioux). During the 1870s, Phillips arranged public forums for reformer Alfred B. Meacham and Indians affected by the country's Indian removal policy, including the Ponca chief Standing Bear, and the Omaha writer and speaker Susette LaFlesche Tibbles.

Illness and death 
By late January 1884, Phillips was suffering from heart disease. Phillips delivered his last public address on January 26, 1884, over the objections of his physician. Phillips spoke at the unveiling of a statue to Harriet Martineau. At the time of the speech, he said that he thought it would be his last.

Phillips died in his home, on Common Street in Boston's neighborhood of Charlestown, on February 2, 1884.

A solemn funeral was held at Hollis Street Church four days later. His body was taken to Faneuil Hall, where it lay in state for several hours. Phillips was then buried at Granary Burying Ground. In April 1886, his remains were exhumed and reburied at Milton Cemetery in Milton.

On February 12, a memorial service was held at the Bethel African Methodist Episcopal Church on Sullivan Street in New York City. Rev. William B. Derrick gave a eulogy, describing Phillips as a friend of humanity and a citizen of the world. Timothy Thomas Fortune also eulogized Phillips, calling him a reformer who was as bold as a lion, who had reformed a great wrong, and who had left a rejuvenated Constitution.

On February 8, in the U.S. House of Representatives, John F. Finerty offered resolutions of respect to the memory of Phillips. William W. Eaton objected to the resolutions.

A memorial event was held in Tremont Temple, Boston, on April 9, 1884. Archibald Grimké delivered a eulogy.

Irish poet and journalist John Boyle O'Reilly, who was a good friend of Phillips, wrote the poem Wendell Phillips in his honor.

Recognition and legacy 

In 1904, the Chicago Public Schools opened Wendell Phillips High School in the Bronzeville neighborhood on the south side of Chicago in Phillips' honor.

In July 1915, a monument was erected in Boston Public Garden to commemorate Phillips, inscribed with his words: "Whether in chains or in laurels, liberty knows nothing but victories."  Jonathan Harr's "A Civil Action" refers to the statue in recounting Mark Phillips,' a descendant of Wendell Phillips,' reaction to a legal victory in the case against W.R. Grace & Co. et al.

The Phillips Neighborhood of Minneapolis was named after "Wendell Phillips, a 19th century abolitionist."

A phrase from his speech of January 20, 1861, "I think the first duty of society is justice," sometimes wrongly attributed to Alexander Hamilton, appears on various courthouses around the United States, including in Nashville, Tennessee.

The Wendell Phillips Award, established in 1896, is bestowed annually upon a member of Tufts University's senior class. The Wendell Phillips Prize at Harvard University is awarded to the best orator in the sophomore class.

The Wendell Phillips School in Washington, D.C., was named in his honor in 1890. The school closed in 1950 and was turned into the Phillips School Condominium in 2002.

The main building of the College of the Pacific at the University of the Pacific is named the Wendell Phillips Center, but it is named for a different Wendell Phillips (archaeologist).

Writings

See also 
 Dyer Lum, labor activist and abolitionist who ran for Lieutenant Governor of Massachusetts on Phillips' ticket.

Notes

Footnotes

Further reading 
 Aisèrithe, A.J. and Donald Yacovone (eds.), Wendell Phillips, Social Justice, and the Power of the Past. Baton Rouge, LA: LSU Press, 2016.
 Bartlett, Irving H. "The Persistence of Wendell Phillips," in Martin Duberman (ed.), The Antislavery Vanguard: New Essays on the Abolitionists. Princeton, NJ: Princeton University Press, 1965; pp. 102–122.
 Bartlett, Irving H. Wendell and Ann Phillips: The Community of Reform, 1840–1880. New York: W.W. Norton, 1982.
 Bartlett, Irving H.  Wendell Phillips: Brahmin Radical. Boston: Beacon Press, 1961.
 Debs, Eugene V., "Wendell Phillips: Orator and Abolitionist," Pearson's Magazine, vol. 37, no. 5 (May 1917), pp. 397–402.
 Filler, Louis (ed.), "Wendell Phillips on Civil Rights and Freedom," New York: Hill and Wang, 1965.
 Hofstadter, Richard. "Wendell Phillips: The Patrician as Agitator" in The American Political Tradition: And the Men Who Made It. New York: Alfred A. Knopf, 1948.
 Osofsky, Gilbert. "Wendell Phillips and the Quest for a New American National Identity" Canadian Review of Studies in Nationalism, vol. 1, no. 1 (1973), pp. 15–46.
 Stewart, James Brewer.  Wendell Phillips: Liberty's Hero. LSU Press, 1986. 356 pp.
 Stewart, James B. "Heroes, Villains, Liberty, and License: The Abolitionist Vision of Wendell Phillips" in Antislavery Reconsidered: New Perspectives on the Abolitionists Baton Rouge, LA: LSU Press, 1979; pp. 168–191.

External links 

 
 
 
 Article from "Impeach Andrew Johnson"
 'Toussaint L'Ouverture' A lecture by Wendell Phillips (1861)
 The Liberator Files, Items concerning Wendell Phillips from Horace Seldon's collection and summary of research of William Lloyd Garrison's The Liberator original copies at the Boston Public Library, Boston, Massachusetts.
 Letters, 1855, n.d.. Schlesinger Library, Radcliffe Institute, Harvard University.
 The story of The Liberator is retold in the radio drama "The Liberators (Part I)", a presentation from Destination Freedom

1811 births
1884 deaths
Abolitionists from Boston
Boston Latin School alumni
Harvard Law School alumni
Harvard College alumni
Lawyers from Boston
Male feminists
Native Americans' rights activists
People of Massachusetts in the American Civil War
Phillips family (New England)
American temperance activists
Lecturers
Burials at Granary Burying Ground